was a 20th-century Japanese painter and woodblock printmaker. He is regarded as one of the greatest artists of the shin-hanga style, and is noted especially for his excellent landscape prints. Yoshida travelled widely, and was particularly known for his images of non-Japanese subjects done in traditional Japanese woodblock style, including the Taj Mahal, the Swiss Alps, the Grand Canyon, and other National Parks in the United States.

Biography 

Hiroshi Yoshida (born Hiroshi Ueda) was born in the city of Kurume, Fukuoka, in Kyushu, on September 19, 1876. He showed an early aptitude for art fostered by his adoptive father, a teacher of painting in the public schools. At age 19 he was sent to Kyoto to study under Tamura Shoryu, a well known teacher of western style painting. He then studied under Koyama Shōtarō, in Tokyo, for another three years.

In 1899, Yoshida had his first American exhibition at Detroit Museum of Art (now Detroit Institute of Art). He then traveled to Boston, Washington, D.C., Providence and Europe. In 1920, Yoshida presented his first woodcut at the Watanabe Print Workshop, organized by Watanabe Shōzaburō (1885–1962), publisher and advocate of the shin-hanga movement. However, Yoshida's collaboration with Watanabe was short partly due to Watanabe's shop burning down because of the  Great Kanto earthquake on September 1, 1923.

In 1925, he hired a group of professional carvers and printers, and established his own studio. Prints were made under his close supervision. Yoshida combined the ukiyo-e collaborative system with the sōsaku-hanga principle of "artist's prints", and formed a third school, separating himself from the shin-hanga and sōsaku-hanga movement. His art is used all around the world, wanting to inspire young artists to follow their hearts and to teach them that they should do what they'd like, even if nobody else in the room agrees. Hiroshi's art is used with clear credit to his name, and a small summary about his life.

At the age of 73, Yoshida took his last sketching trip to Izu and Nagaoka and painted his last works The Sea of Western Izu and The Mountains of Izu.  He became sick on the trip and returned to Tokyo where he died April 5, 1950 at his home. His tomb is in the grounds of the Ryuun-in, in Koishikawa, Tokyo.

Artistic style 

Hiroshi Yoshida was trained in the Western oil painting tradition, which was adopted in Japan during the Meiji period. Yoshida often used the same blocks and varied the colour to suggest different moods. The best example of such is Sailing Boats in 1921. 

Yoshida's extensive travel and acquaintance with Americans influenced his art considerably. In 1931 a series of prints depicting scenes from India, Pakistan, Afghanistan, and Singapore was published. Six of these were views of the Taj Mahal in different moods and colors.

His works are held in several museums  worldwide, including the British Museum, the Toledo Museum of Art, the Brooklyn Museum, the Harvard Art Museums, the Saint Louis Art Museum, the Dallas Museum of Art, the University of Michigan Museum of Art, the Clark Art Institute, the Portland Art Museum, the Indianapolis Museum of Art, the Carnegie Museum of Art, the Tokyo Fuji Art Museum, the Detroit Institute of Arts, the Seattle Art Museum, the Museum of Fine Arts, Boston, the Fine Arts Museum of San Francisco, the Davis Museum at Wellesley College, and the Mount Holyoke College Art Museum.

The Yoshida family legacy 

The artistic lineage of the Yoshida family of eight artists: Kasaburo Yoshida (1861–1894), whose wife Rui Yoshida was an artist; their daughter Fujio Yoshida (1887–1987); Hiroshi Yoshida (1876–1950), their adopted son, who married Fujio; Tōshi Yoshida (1911–1995), Hiroshi's son, whose wife Kiso Yoshida (1919–2005) was an artist; Hodaka Yoshida (1926–1995), another of Hiroshi's sons, whose wife Chizuko Yoshida (1924–2017) and daughter Ayomi Yoshida (b. 1958) are artists. This group, four men and four women spanning four generations, provides an interesting perspective in looking at Japanese history and art development in the turbulent 20th Century. Although they inherit the same tradition, the Yoshida family artists work in different styles with different sensibilities. Toshi Yoshida and the Yoshida family have used the original Hiroshi Yoshida woodblocks to create later versions, including posthumous, of Hiroshi Yoshida prints.  Prints created under Hiroshi Yoshida's management with special care have a jizuri seal kanji stamp. Jizuri means  and indicates that Hiroshi Yoshida played an active role in the printing process of the respective print. The Hiroshi Yoshida signatures vary depending on the agents and time of creation. Hiroshi Yoshida prints sold originally in the Japanese market will not have a pencil signature or title in English.

Publications 
Japanese Woodblock Printing, comprehensive guide to the craft of woodblock printing written by Hiroshi Yoshida was published by The Sanseido Company, Ltd. in Tokyo and Osaka in 1939.

Gallery

References

Bibliography 
 Allen, Laura W. A Japanese Legacy: Four Generations of Yoshida Family Artists. Minneapolis: Minneapolis Institute of Arts, Chicago: Art Media Resources, c2002. 
 Hiroshi Yoshida. https://web.archive.org/web/20070807134701/http://spectacle.berkeley.edu/~fiorillo/texts/shinhangatexts/shinhanga_pages/yoshida3.html. Retrieved September 3, 2006.
"The American Travels of Yoshida Hiroshi", Eugene M. Skibbe, in Andon 43, January 1993, pp. 59–74,   
Yoshida Hiroshi The Complete Woodblock Prints of Yoshida Hiroshi. Abe Publishing Co, Tokyo, 1987.
Yoshida Toshi & Rei Yuki "Japanese Printmaking, A Handbook of Traditional & Modern Techniques". Charles E. Tuttle Co.Inc, Rutland, Vermont & Tokyo, Japan: c1966.
Blakeney, Ben B. "Yoshida Hiroshi Print-maker". Tokyo, Japan: Foreign Affairs Association of Japan, 1953
Yoshida, Hiroshi. Japanese Wood-Block Printing. Tokyo & Osaka: Sanseido Co., Ltd, 1939

External links 

Los Angeles County Museum of Art
Online text and pictures of Japanese Woodblock Printing

1876 births
1950 deaths
Japanese printmakers
Ukiyo-e artists
People from Kurume
Shin hanga artists
20th-century Japanese painters
20th-century printmakers
Landscape artists